Never Trust a Pretty Face is the third studio album by French singer Amanda Lear, released by the West German label Ariola Records in 1979. The album included notable hit singles "The Sphinx" and "Fashion Pack (Studio 54)", and turned out a commercial and critical success.

Background 
After two successful albums, Lear was teamed up again with producer Anthony Monn to work on their next effort. Never Trust a Pretty Face was recorded between September and December 1978 at Musicland Studios in Munich, Germany, and released in early 1979. Most songs were composed by Monn, and all lyrics but one were written by Lear herself. Musically, the album was a combination of disco, which was at the peak of its popularity at that time, with other musical genres, such as rock on "Forget It", cabaret music on "Miroir" and electronica on "Black Holes" and "Intellectually". It also included a German-English dance version of a war-time classic "Lili Marleen" and a number of ballads, making it one of Lear's most diverse albums. The song "Black Holes" was dedicated to Salvador Dalí.

The promotional campaign for Never Trust a Pretty Face effectively continued to play on Lear's "devil in disguise" persona, portraying her as a mythological creature on the album cover, smiling innocently in the Egyptian desert with angel's wings and a snake's tail. The same image was reproduced on a giant 24"×36" fold-out poster which came with most European editions. The picture on the back cover of the album depicted Amanda dressed in a suit, complete with a bow tie, holding a cigarette, referencing Marlene Dietrich's classic gender-bending image.

The ballad "The Sphinx" was released as the lead single in the autumn 1978 to a considerable chart success. The second single was the upbeat disco track "Fashion Pack" which turned out moderately successful across Europe. "Lili Marleen" was released as a promotional single and charted in Italy.

In France, the album included a German-French language version of "Lili Marleen". For the UK release, the track listing was re-arranged and additionally included an edit of "Blood and Honey", a hit single from Lear's debut album. A picture disc edition was also released in the UK, containing "Blood and Honey", an English language recording of "Miroir" and an extended version of "Dreamer (South Pacific)". In Argentina, the album was released as Nunca confíes en una cara bonita. The record was a commercial success, performing best in France, where it reached the Top 10. It also placed within the Top 20 in Canadian Disco Albums Chart, being one of the very few Amanda Lear's releases to have charted on the North American continent. The album is now widely recognized as one of Lear's best works and holds the "Album Pick" status on AllMusic. Lear was also the fourth most popular female artist in Germany in 1979.

The rights to the Ariola-Eurodisc back catalogue are currently held by Sony BMG. Like most of Amanda's albums from the Ariola Records era, Never Trust a Pretty Face has not received the official CD re-issue, excluding Russian bootleg re-releases.

Track listing

Original release 
Side A
 "Fashion Pack" (Anthony Monn, Amanda Lear) – 5:05
 "Forget It" (Anthony Monn, Amanda Lear) – 4:10
 "Lili Marleen" (Norbert Schultze, Hans Leip, Tommie Connor) – 4:40
 "Never Trust a Pretty Face" (Anthony Monn, Amanda Lear) – 4:45

Side B
 "The Sphinx" (Anthony Monn, Amanda Lear) – 4:20
 "Black Holes" (Anthony Monn, Amanda Lear) – 5:00
 "Intellectually" (Charly Ricanek, Amanda Lear) – 4:15
 "Miroir" (Amanda Lear) – 2:00
 "Dreamer (South Pacific)" (Rainer Pietsch, Amanda Lear) – 5:10

UK edition 
Side A
 "Fashion Pack" (Anthony Monn, Amanda Lear) – 5:05
 "Forget It" (Anthony Monn, Amanda Lear) – 4:10
 "Intellectually" (Charly Ricanek, Amanda Lear) – 4:15
 "Blood and Honey" (Anthony Monn, Amanda Lear) – 3:10
 "Never Trust a Pretty Face" (Anthony Monn, Amanda Lear) – 4:45

Side B
 "The Sphinx" (Anthony Monn, Amanda Lear) – 4:20
 "Black Holes" (Anthony Monn, Amanda Lear) – 5:00
 "Lili Marleen" (Norbert Schultze, Hans Leip, Tommie Connor) – 4:40
 "Miroir" (Amanda Lear) – 2:00
 "Dreamer (South Pacific)" (Rainer Pietsch, Amanda Lear) – 5:10

UK picture disc 
Side A
 "Fashion Pack" (Anthony Monn, Amanda Lear) – 5:05
 "Forget It" (Anthony Monn, Amanda Lear) – 4:10
 "Intellectually" (Charly Ricanek, Amanda Lear) – 4:15
 "Blood & Honey" (Anthony Monn, Amanda Lear) – 4:45
 "Never Trust a Pretty Face" (Anthony Monn, Amanda Lear) – 4:45

Side B
 "The Sphinx" (Anthony Monn, Amanda Lear) – 4:20
 "Black Holes" (Anthony Monn, Amanda Lear) – 5:00
 "Lili Marleen" (Norbert Schultze, Hans Leip, Tommie Connor) – 4:40
 "Mirrors" (Amanda Lear) – 2:00
 "Dreamer (South Pacific)" (Rainer Pietsch, Amanda Lear) – 5:58

Personnel 

 Amanda Lear – lead vocals
 Geoff Bastow – guitar
 Etienne Cap – brass
 Judy Cheeks – backing vocals
 Curt Cress – drums
 George Delagaye – brass
 Wolly Emperhoff – backing vocals
 Keith Forsey – drums
 Benny Gebauer – brass
 Günter Gebauer – bass guitar
 Les Hurdle – bass guitar
 Dave King – bass guitar
 Billy Lang – guitar
 Peter Lüdermann – sound engineer

 Renate Mauer – backing vocals
 Anthony Monn – record producer, Moog
 Ralf Nowy – musical arranger (tracks: A4, B1)
 Rainer Pietsch – musical arranger (track B5), backing vocals
 Walter Rab – brass
 Charly Ricanek – musical arranger (tracks: A1, A2, A3, B2, B3, B4), keyboards, Moog
 Jürgen Rogner – artwork
 Kristian Schultze – Moog
 Claudia Schwarz – backing vocals
 Giuseppe Solera – brass
 Denis Taranto – photography
 Eric Thöner – backing vocals
 Manfred Vormstein – art direction and concept

Chart performance

Weekly charts

Year-end charts

Release history

References

External links 
 Never Trust a Pretty Face at Discogs
 Never Trust a Pretty Face at Rate Your Music

1979 albums
Amanda Lear albums